The R357 is a Regional Route in South Africa that connects Nieuwoudtville and Kimberley via Loeriesfontein and Prieska.

Route
The route's western origin is the R27 at Nieuwoudtville. It heads north-east to reach the R355, with which it is co-signed for 10 kilometres. The routes reach Louriesfontein, where they diverge. The R357 heads north-east again to reach Brandvlei. Here it again crosses the R27, at a staggered junction. East of the town, the route gives off the south-easterly R353, and heads east. It reaches Vanwyksvlei, where it meets the R361, the two are co-signed, and head north-east. The routes diverge just outside the town. The R357 continues east-north-east to Prieska. Just before the town, it meets the north-easterly R386 at its northern terminus. It then passes through Prieskapoort Pass and crosses the N10 to enter Prieska. It leaves the town heading east-north-east. After about 30 kilometres, it meets the western terminus of the R369. It continues for about another 100 kilometres to cross the Orange River and reach Douglas. At Douglas, it meets the R385 at a staggered junction. From Douglas, it continues east-north-east to its end at the R31 at Kimberley.

External links
 Routes Travel Info

References

Regional Routes in the Northern Cape